Trumpington Community College is a co-educational secondary school located in the Trumpington area of Cambridge in the English county of Cambridgeshire. The school is named after the village of Trumpington which is located nearby.

The school was constructed to serve the southern fringe expansion of Cambridge, and opened in September 2015. The school building was designed by Avanti Architects, and was awarded a commendation at the 2017 Civic Trust Awards.

Trumpington Community College is an academy sponsored by United Learning, and forms part of the United Learning Cambridge Cluster along with Cambridge Academy for Science and Technology, Coleridge Community College and Parkside Community College. Trumpington Community College offers GCSEs and BTECs as programmes of study for pupils.

References

External links

Academies in Cambridgeshire
Secondary schools in Cambridgeshire
Educational institutions established in 2015
2015 establishments in England
United Learning schools